Mary St Domitille Hickey (13 April 1882 – 20 June 1958) was a New Zealand Catholic nun, school principal and historian. She was born in Ōpunake, New Zealand, on 13 April 1882.

References

1882 births
1958 deaths
New Zealand women historians
People from Ōpunake
20th-century New Zealand Roman Catholic nuns
New Zealand schoolteachers
20th-century New Zealand historians
20th-century New Zealand women writers